Kibatalia arborea is a tree in the dogbane family Apocynaceae.

Description
The bark is grey, grey-brown, dark brown or black. Inflorescences bear up to two flowers. The flowers feature a white or creamy corolla. Local traditional medicinal uses include as a treatment for internal parasites.

Distribution and habitat
Kibatalia arborea is native to Thailand and a wide area of Malesia. Its habitat is in lowland forests from sea-level to  altitude.

References

arborea
Medicinal plants of Asia
Trees of Thailand
Trees of Malesia
Plants described in 1826